Arani, Tamil Nadu may refer to several places:

 Arni, Tiruvannamalai, also written as Arani, a town in Tiruvannamalai district, Tamil Nadu
 Arani, Chennai, a suburb of Chennai, Tiruvallur district, Tamil Nadu
 Arani river,  a river in India that flows through the states of Tamil Nadu and Andhra Pradesh